"(You're a) Strange Animal" is a song by Scottish-born Canadian musician Lawrence Gowan. Released in May 1985 as the second single from his second studio album, Strange Animal, it reached number 15 in Canada.

Background
Gowan's inspiration came from the writings of Hermann Hesse and an interest pull that various individuals can have on life.

Charts

Popular Culture
The song is featured in the 2022 horror movie Nope. It serves as the theme song to a fictional sitcom titled Gordy's Home, which factors heavily into the plot. It can be heard in the film itself, and was also featured in viral marketing. The song was occasionally used as a theme song for the online comedy series Louder with Crowder.

References

1985 songs
Lawrence Gowan songs